Yongjian (永建) may refer to:

Yongjian, Yunnan, a town in Weishan Yi and Hui Autonomous County, Yunnan, China
Yongjian (126–132), the era name used by Emperor Shun of Han
Yongjian (420–421), the era name used by Li Xun, ruler of Western Liang